Horst Riege (born 27 April 1953) is a former German football player and manager. He is currently Director of Sports at KFC Uerdingen 05.

He most notably played at Bayer 05 Uerdingen.

References

External links 
 

1953 births
Living people
German footballers
Association football defenders
Bundesliga players
2. Bundesliga players
KFC Uerdingen 05 players
German football managers
KFC Uerdingen 05 managers
Footballers from Essen